Kalyan-Dombivli Municipal Corporation is the governing body of the city of Kalyan-Dombivli, located in the Thane district of the Indian state of Maharashtra. The municipal corporation consists of elected members from each municipal ward of the city knowns as councillors, is headed by a mayor and in his/her absence by a deputy mayor, elected from amongst councillors. The municipal corporation administers the city's infrastructure, public services and transport.

Municipal authorities are :-

1) a Corporation (also known as General Body)

2) a Standing Committee

3) Ward Committees

4) a Mayor

5) a Commissioner

6) a Transport Committee

7) a Transport Manager

Members from the state's leading various political parties hold elected offices in the corporation.

Revenue sources 

The following are the Income sources for the corporation from the Central and State Government.

Revenue from taxes 
Following is the Tax related revenue for the corporation.

 Property tax.
 Profession tax.
 Entertainment tax.
 Grants from Central and State Government like Goods and Services Tax.
 Advertisement tax.

Revenue from non-tax sources 

Following is the Non Tax related revenue for the corporation.

 Water usage charges.
 Fees from Documentation services.
 Rent received from municipal property.
 Funds from municipal bonds.

Composition

List of Mayor

List of Deputy Mayor

Electoral Performance in 2015

Political performance in Election 2015

Electoral Performance in 2010

Political performance in Election 2010 
The results of the 2010 election are shown below.

The corporation implemented an e-governance scheme in 2002, which is being replicated across Maharashtra.

Kalyan-Dombivali Municipal Corporation is currently controlled by a coalition of the Shiv Sena and Bharatiya Janata parties. Shiv Sena member Kalyani Nitin Patil currently serves as mayor.

In the year 2012, There was a reelection for ward no.30. Due to the resignation of Rajendra Deolekar, An reelection was held and Prabhunath Aatmaram Bhoir of Shiv Sena won the election.

Commissioner KDMC 
Shri. E. Raveendran (IAS),
Date Of Joining KDMC - July 2015-May 2017

Shri P Velarasu (IAS)
May 2017 – Mar 2018

Shri Govind Bodke (IAS)
March 2018 -  Feb 2020

Present Commissioner of KDMC: Dr. Bhausaheb Dangade (IAS) 
Date of Joining KDMC-14.02.2020

References

External links 
 Kalyan-Dombivali Municipal Corporation
 KDMC Election updates on Twitter

Kalyan-Dombivli
Municipal corporations in Maharashtra
Year of establishment missing